David Barksdale (born Donise David Barksdale; May 24, 1947 – September 2, 1974), also known as King David, was an American gangster and activist  from Chicago, Illinois. Barksdale was the founder of the Black Disciples. He and Larry Hoover (leader of the Supreme Gangsters) decided to merge and create the Black Gangster Disciple Nation. He was seen as a hero in the black community because he operated a free breakfast program in englewood to poor children, and he and the Disciples marched with Martin Luther King Jr. in Marquette Park. He was a close friend of Fred Hampton. Barksdale died on September 2, 1974, due to kidney failure, at the age of 27.

Biography
Born Donise David Barksdale in Sallis, Mississippi to parents Virginia and Charlie Barksdale, he was the tenth of thirteen children. His family moved to Chicago, Illinois in 1957. Within three years of arriving, Barksdale had become a notorious gang leader. By 1966, Barksdale's gang absorbed several others and became known as the Black Disciple Nation. Tensions grew between the Black Disciples and other gangs such as the Black Stone Rangers. in the late 1960s, King David, as he had become known, started to lead the Black Disciples into activism, serving breakfast to school children and marching with Dr. Martin Luther King Jr. in Marquette park during the Chicago Freedom Movement. He was a close friend to Fred Hampton and the Chicago Black Panther Party.

Barksdale eventually grew sick of the bloodshed and proposed a merger with Larry Hoover, founder of the Supreme Gangsters, in 1973. Hoover accepted, and the Black Gangster Disciple Nation was born. Over the course of his life Barksdale was arrested 25 times, but never convicted of any serious offense. On several occasions when he was arrested, he used the alias "David Jones".

Death and legacy

On September 2, 1974, Barksdale died from kidney failure as a result of a June 1970 attack in which there was an attempt on his life by members of the Black P Stone Rangers armed with M14 rifles outside of a bar Barksdale was frequenting with Larry Hoover on 848 West 69th Street. The assassination attempt ended a truce that was in place at the time. He was buried at Restvale Cemetery in Alsip, Illinois. He was survived by his three children: David, Melinda and Ronnie Barksdale (one of whom was gunned down by a member of the Gangster Disciples street gang in 1996), and wife Yvonne Barksdale (née Yarber), until she was murdered three years later in June 1977.
 
Barksdale is still revered by the Black Disciples. Every year there is a birthday celebration in his honor. In 2008, there was a parade that was sponsored and supported by the Black Disciples organization, and in a controversial move, registered by the Chicago City Council for the Saturday of Memorial Day Weekend. The parade was criticized by the Fraternal Order of Police, and officers administering the event were forewarned about potential gang violence.

References

1947 births
Gangsters from Chicago
People from Attala County, Mississippi
American crime bosses
African-American gangsters
American gangsters
Gang members
1974 deaths
20th-century African-American people
Burials at Restvale Cemetery